Sadat Ali Sikder is a Awami League politician and the former member of parliament for Dhaka-27.

Career
Sikder was elected to parliament from Dhaka-27 as an Awami League candidate in 1973.

Death
Sikder died on 19 June 2017 at Combined Military Hospital (Dhaka).

References

Awami League politicians
2017 deaths
1st Jatiya Sangsad members